ILD may refer to:

Organizations 
 Independent Lutheran Diocese a small Confessional Lutheran Association in the United States.
 International Liaison Department of the Chinese Communist Party, a minister-level department of the Chinese government
 Institute for Liberty and Democracy, a think tank in Lima, Peru
 International Labor Defense (1925–1946), a legal defense organization of the Communist Party USA

Science and technology 

 Interaural level difference (or interaural intensity difference), a sound property that allows spatial localization of the sound source
 Interstitial lung disease, a group of lung diseases that affect tissue between the airways
 Injection Laser Diode, a type of semiconductor laser used in optical networks

Miscellaneous 

 Internet Listing Display, a set of rules put forth by the National Association of Realtors (USA) that regulate how homes and properties can be displayed on internet sites
 Indentation load-deflection, an alternate term for Indentation force-deflection, a process for grading the firmness of rubber foams

Codes 

 the IATA airport designator of Lleida-Alguaire Airport, Alguaire, Catalonia, Spain.